Open House or Open house may refer to:

Events
 Artists Open House, similar to an Open Studio but held at a residential venue
 Doors Open Days, allowing free access to buildings of historical or architectural interest not normally open to the public
 Open house (school), at a school
 Open House Chicago, an annual architecture festival in Chicago, Illinois, US
 Open House London, an annual architecture festival in London, UK
 Open House Brno, an annual architecture festival in Brno, Czech republic
 Open house, held by a volunteer fire department
 Open house, by a real estate agent to show a listed residential property to any interested parties; See Real estate transaction

Film
 Open House (1987 film), a horror film starring Joseph Bottoms
 Open House (2004 film), an independent film
 Open House (2010 film), a film starring Stephen Moyer
 Open House (2018 film), a Netflix film

Literature
 Open House, a 1941 collection of poetry by Theodore Roethke
 Open House (novel), a 2000 novel by Elizabeth Berg

Music

Albums
 Open House (album), a 1960 album by jazz organist Jimmy Smith
 Open House!, a 1963 album by jazz organist Johnny "Hammond" Smith
 Open House, a 1992 solo album by Irish folk fiddler Kevin Burke and the band that later took its name from the album
 Open House (EP), a 2007 EP by Jaci Velasquez

Other music
 Open House (band), a musical group led by Kevin Burke
 "Open House", a song by Lou Reed and John Cale on the 1990 album Songs for Drella

Television

Episodes
 "Open House" (American Horror Story), a 2011 episode of the television show American Horror Story
 "Open House" (The Americans), a 2015 episode of the television show The Americans
 "Open House" (Breaking Bad), a 2011 episode of Breaking Bad
 "Open House" (Pee-wee's Playhouse), a 1987 episode of Pee-wee's Playhouse

Series
 Open House (1957 TV series), a 1957 Australian television series
 Open House (1964 TV series), a 1964 British series that aired on BBC
 Open House (1989 TV series), a 1989–1990 American sitcom that aired on Fox
 Open House (2007 TV program), a 2007-present American luxury real estate program produced by LXTV and aired on NBC
 Open House (2009 TV program) or Your Bottom Line, a 2009–2010 CNN weekend financial news program
 Open House (Canadian TV series), a 1952 Canadian television series
 Open House (Irish TV programme), an Irish daytime chat show
 Open House with Gloria Hunniford, a UK daytime chat show
 'Open House, the Great Sex Experiment' Channel 4 series, 2022.

Other uses
 Open House (FP7), a project launched by the European Seventh Framework Program
 Jerusalem Open House, an Israeli gay rights organisation
 Open House (Australia), a live talkback Christian radio show

See also
 European Heritage Days